Heliocheilus ionola is a moth in the family Noctuidae. It is found in the Australian Capital Territory, New South Wales, the Northern Territory, Queensland, and Western Australia.

External links
Australian Caterpillars
Australian Faunal Directory

Heliocheilus
Moths of Australia